Abradinou is a village in south-eastern Ivory Coast. It is in the sub-prefecture of Bettié, Bettié Department, Indénié-Djuablin Region, Comoé District. The village lies on the east bank of the Komoé River, which is the boundary between the Comoé and Lagunes Districts.

Abradinou was a commune until March 2012, when it became one of 1126 communes nationwide that were abolished.

Notes

Former communes of Ivory Coast
Populated places in Comoé District
Populated places in Indénié-Djuablin